Parera is a Catalan surname. Notable people with the surname include:

Blas Parera (1777–1840), Spanish composer
Manuel Parera (1907–1975), Spanish footballer
Silvia Parera (born 1969), Spanish swimmer
Valentín Parera (1895–1986), Spanish actor

Catalan-language surnames